Francis Castaing (born 22 April 1959) is a French former professional road bicycle racer. He won one stage in the 1985 Tour de France. He also competed in the individual road race event at the 1980 Summer Olympics.

Major results

1979
Tour de Gironde
1980
Bordeaux - Saintes
1981
 French National Track Championships
Paris–Bourges
1982
GP de Peymeinade
GP Ouest-France
 National Track Points race Championship
1984
Brest
Quilan
1985
Breuillet
Lanester
Rodez
Tour de France:
Winner stage 6
Castillon-la-Bataille
1986
Ronde d'Aix-en-Provence
Tour de Vendée
1987
Bordeaux

References

External links 

Official Tour de France results for Francis Castaing

French male cyclists
1959 births
Living people
French Tour de France stage winners
Olympic cyclists of France
Cyclists at the 1980 Summer Olympics
Sportspeople from Bordeaux
Cyclists from Nouvelle-Aquitaine
20th-century French people
21st-century French people